Deni Milošević (born 9 March 1995) is a Bosnian professional footballer who plays as an attacking midfielder for 1. Lig club Sakaryaspor, on loan from Antalyaspor.

Milošević started his professional career at Standard Liège, who loaned him to Beveren in 2015. The following year, he joined Konyaspor. In 2021, he switched to Antalyaspor, who sent him on loan to Sakaryaspor in 2022.

Milošević represented Belgium and Bosnia and Herzegovina at youth levels, but decided to represent the latter at senior level. He made his senior international debut in 2018, earning 11 caps until 2020.

Club career

Early career
Milošević came through youth academy of his hometown club Standard Liège. He made his professional debut in UEFA Europa League game against Elfsborg on 12 December 2013 at the age of 18.

In September 2015, he was sent on a season-long loan to Beveren. On 20 September, he scored his first professional goal against Club Brugge.

Konyaspor
In June 2016, Milošević was transferred to Turkish outfit Konyaspor for an undisclosed fee. He made his official debut for the side against Rizespor on 20 August. On 23 October, he scored his first goal for Konyaspor in UEFA Europa League match against Braga. It was team's first goal in European competitions. Three months later, he scored his first league goal. He won his first title with Konyaspor, club's first trophy ever, on 31 May 2017, by beating İstanbul Başakşehir in Turkish Cup final.

Milošević played his 100th game for the team against Kahramanmaraşspor on 31 October 2018.

In January 2019, he extended his contract until June 2022.

Antalyaspor
In July 2021, Milošević moved to Antalyaspor on a three-year deal. He made his competitive debut for the side on 15 August against Göztepe. On 28 October, he scored his first goal for Antalyaspor in Turkish Cup tie against Diyarbakırspor.

In September 2022, he was loaned to Sakaryaspor until the end of season.

International career
Despite representing Belgium at various youth levels, Milošević decided to play for Bosnia and Herzegovina at senior level. He was first part of Bosnia and Herzegovina under-21 team.

In August 2015, his request to change sports citizenship from Belgian to Bosnian was approved by FIFA. Subsequently, he received his first senior call-up in August 2017, for 2018 FIFA World Cup qualifiers against Cyprus and Gibraltar, but had to wait until 23 March 2018 to make his debut in a friendly game against Bulgaria.

On 23 March 2019, in a UEFA Euro 2020 qualifier against Armenia, Milošević scored his first senior international goal.

Personal life
Milošević's father Cvijan was also a professional footballer.

Career statistics

Club

International

Scores and results list Bosnia and Herzegovina's goal tally first, score column indicates score after each Milošević goal.

Honours
Konyaspor
Turkish Cup: 2016–17
Turkish Super Cup: 2017

References

External links

1995 births
Living people
Footballers from Liège
Belgian people of Bosnia and Herzegovina descent
Citizens of Bosnia and Herzegovina through descent
Belgian footballers
Belgium youth international footballers
Belgian expatriate footballers
Bosnia and Herzegovina footballers
Bosnia and Herzegovina under-21 international footballers
Bosnia and Herzegovina international footballers
Bosnia and Herzegovina expatriate footballers
Association football midfielders
Standard Liège players
S.K. Beveren players
Konyaspor footballers
Antalyaspor footballers
Sakaryaspor footballers
Belgian Pro League players
Süper Lig players
TFF First League players
Expatriate footballers in Turkey
Belgian expatriate sportspeople in Turkey
Bosnia and Herzegovina expatriate sportspeople in Belgium
Bosnia and Herzegovina expatriate sportspeople in Turkey